Euxinella is a genus of gastropods belonging to the family Clausiliidae.

The species of this genus are found in Greece.

Species:

Euxinella alpinella 
Euxinella radikae 
Euxinella subaii

References

Clausiliidae